The women's shot put at the 2012 World Junior Championships in Athletics will be held at the Estadi Olímpic Lluís Companys on 10 July.

Medalists

Records
, the existing world junior and championship records were as follows.

Results

Qualification

Qualification: Standard 15.70 m (Q) or at least best 12 qualified (q)

Final

Participation
According to an unofficial count, 22 athletes from 19 countries participated in the event.

References

External links
WJC12 Shot put schedule

Shot Put
Shot put at the World Athletics U20 Championships
2012 in women's athletics